

241001–241100 

|-id=090
| 241090 Nemet ||  || Timothy Nemet (born 1996) displayed unrivaled enthusiasm in the pursuit of astronomical knowledge, following in the Canadian tradition of astronomical excellence and embodying the spirit of Beyond the International Year of Astronomy. || 
|}

241101–241200 

|-id=113
| 241113 Zhongda ||  || The Sun Yat-sen University, also unofficially referred as Zhongshan University, is ranked as one of China's top universities. The first discoverer spent part of his childhood as well as his undergraduate career at the University. || 
|-id=136
| 241136 Sandstede ||  ||  (born 1929), a German chemist active in the development of fuel cells, and a former director of the Battelle Institute, Frankfurt || 
|-id=153
| 241153 Omegagigia ||  || The astronomical society "Omega" (Sociedad Astronómica Asturiana) is based in Gijón, northern Spain. The society was founded in 1981, and awarded a silver medal from the city council of Gijón on the occasion of society's 40th anniversary in 2021. In the asteroid's name, "Gigia" is the Latin name of Gijón. || 
|-id=192
| 241192 Pulyny ||  || The Ukrainian town of Pulyny (also known as Chervonoarmijsk), located in the country's northern province of Zhytomyr Oblast. It is the birthplace of the writers Girsh Diamont (1911–1941), Ernst Kontschak (1903–1979) and Svyatoslav Borodulin (born 1927). || 
|}

241201–241300 

|-id=276
| 241276 Guntramlampert ||  || Guntram Lampert (born 1967) is an Austrian pharmacist, amateur astronomer and telescope maker. He has built a number of Schiefspiegler telescopes and has an excellent reputation as an optician in this field. || 
|}

241301–241400 

|-id=363
| 241363 Érdibálint ||  || Bálint Érdi (born 1945), a Hungarian astronomer and full professor at the Eötvös University in Budapest || 
|-id=364
| 241364 Reneangelil ||  || René Angélil (1942–2016) was a Canadian music producer and singer. Inspired by the cosmos, his motto was generosity. He helped many friends and artists such as world-renowned singer Céline Dion reach their full potential. || 
|}

241401–241500 

|-id=418
| 241418 Darmstadt ||  || Darmstadt, a German city known for its architecture of the Art Nouveau || 
|-id=442
| 241442 Shandongkexie ||  || Shandongkexie is the Chinese phonetic alphabet representation of the Shandong Association for Science and Technology || 
|-id=475
| 241475 Martinagedeck ||  || Martina Gedeck (born 1961), a German actresses || 
|}

241501–241600 

|-id=509
| 241509 Sessler ||  || Gerhard M. Sessler (born 1931) is professor of Electroacoustics at Technischen Universität Darmstadt. || 
|-id=527
| 241527 Edwardwright ||  || Edward L. Wright (born 1947), the Principal Investigator of the Wide-field Infrared Survey Explorer mission and a professor at UCLA. || 
|-id=528
| 241528 Tubman ||  || Harriet Tubman (c. 1822–1913), a "conductor" on the Underground Railroad. || 
|-id=529
| 241529 Roccutri ||  || Roc Cutri (born 1957), an astronomer specializing in analyzing large astronomical datasets. || 
|-id=538
|}

241601–241700 

|-bgcolor=#f2f2f2
| colspan=4 align=center | 
|}

241701–241800 

|-bgcolor=#f2f2f2
| colspan=4 align=center | 
|}

241801–241900 

|-bgcolor=#f2f2f2
| colspan=4 align=center | 
|}

241901–242000 

|-bgcolor=#f2f2f2
| colspan=4 align=center | 
|}

References 

241001-242000